Shell Canada Limited is the principal Canadian subsidiary of British energy major Shell plc and one of Canada's largest integrated oil companies. Exploration and production of oil, natural gas and sulphur is a major part of its business, as well as the marketing of gasoline and related products through the company's approximately 1,800 stations across Canada.

After a global reorganization by the European parent, Shell's North American operations are controlled by Shell Energy North America, which is headquartered in Houston, Texas. Shell Energy North America's Canadian operational unit, Shell Canada, maintains a regional corporate office in Calgary, Alberta. Shell Canada also maintains a major office in Toronto, Ontario.

History

Shell Canada's shares were originally independently traded on the Toronto Stock Exchange. The company was 78% owned by Royal Dutch Shell which in 2006 launched an $8.7-billion takeover of the 22% of Shell Canada that it didn't own. In March 2007 the shareholders of Shell Canada Ltd. accepted a $45.00 per share cash offer from Royal Dutch Shell Plc. This acquisition was primarily driven by the desire of the parent company to take total control of its Canadian division's unconventional resources, specifically the oil sands. The move was unanimously approved by the independent members of the board of directors.

In 2003, Royal Dutch Shell had appointed a British executive, and former Chairman of Shell in the UK, Clive Mather, as president and CEO of Shell Canada.

As a consequence of the stock acquisition by Royal Dutch Shell, all Shell Canada executives holding stock options benefitted. Shell Canada announced on Mr Mather's retirement from the company shortly after the acquisition was completed that his total pay package for his final year (2007-07) was $4.9-million Including bonuses, stock options and pension contributions and that on leaving the company, Mr. Mather was additionally eligible for a lump sum payment equal to his annual gross salary. His total benefit in that year was, therefore $9.8 million of which some $5 million was from exercised stock options, making him one of the highest remunerated employees in Royal Dutch Shell.

In 2006, Shell Canada acquired the oil sands developer BlackRock Ventures Inc.  for C$2.4 billion. As a part of this deal, Shell acquired the Orion oil-sands project near Cold Lake, Alberta.  In May 2012, Shell announced that it has put the project up for sale.

In 2007, the company invested $20 million (CAD) into an expansion at the Brockville Lubricant Plant. In January 2019, it announced plans to invest a further $16 million (CAD) towards new equipment that will increase production and efficiency.

In November 2015, the Shell Canada Quest Energy project began commercial operations. Part of the Athabasca Oil Sands Project, it involves Shell as the major shareholder (60%), Chevron Canada Limited (20%), and Marathon Canadian Oil Sands Holding Limited (20%). It is identified as being the first commercial-scale CCS project, proposing to reduce CO2 emissions in Canada by 1 million tonnes per year.

In April 2017, the company completed an expansion project at the Scotford refinery, growing hydrocracker production by 20%.

Management and employees

Current Shell Canada Directors are Michael Crothers (President and Country Chair), Andrew Dueck (Vice President and Controller), Andrew Harris (Vice President), Barry Tyndall (Vice President, General Counsel and Assistant Secretary) and Zoe Yujnovich (Executive Vice President).

In October 2008, Shell Canada Limited was named one of "Canada's Top 100 Employers" by Mediacorp Canada Inc., and was featured in Maclean's newsmagazine. Later that month, Shell Canada was also named one of Alberta's Top Employers, which was announced by the Calgary Herald and the Edmonton Journal.

Refineries
 Scotford Upgrader and Refinery : 
 Corunna Refinery : 
 Montreal East Refinery :  Closed in 2010

Leadership

President 
Patrick M. Fowlie, 1929–1948
William M. V. Ash, 1948–1961
Paul L. Kartzke, 1962–1968
Harold Bridges, 1968–1970
John F. Bookout, 1970–1974
C. William Daniel, 1974–1985
John M. MacLeod, 1985–1993
Charles W. Wilson, 1993–1999
Timothy W. Faithfull, 1999–2003
Linda Cook, 2003–2004
H. Clive Mather, 2004–2007
W. Adrian Loader, 2007
David R. Collyer, 2008–2009
Lorraine Mitchelmore, 2009–2015
Michael Crothers, 2016–2021
Susannah Pierce, 2021–

See also
Canadian Environment Awards

References

External links
 

Shell plc subsidiaries
Oil companies of Canada
Natural gas companies of Canada
Automotive fuel retailers
Gas stations in Canada
Canadian brands
Chemical companies of Canada
Energy companies established in 1911
Non-renewable resource companies established in 1911
Retail companies established in 1911
Companies based in Calgary
Canadian subsidiaries of foreign companies
1911 establishments in Quebec
Canadian companies established in 1911